Rolando Díaz is a Cuban film director and writer. He directed about 19 documentary films. In 1984 he made his first feature film, comedy Los pájaros tirándole a la escopeta ("Birds Swinging a Shotgun"). The film received several Cuban and international awards. Many of his later films, despite international success, until 2010s were allowed limited screening in Cuba.

Since 1994 he lives on Tenerife, Canary Islands, Spain.

References

1947 births
Living people
Cuban film directors
Cuban screenwriters
Male screenwriters
Spanish film directors